Chole Island Ruins (Magofu ya kale ya Kisiwa cha Chole in Swahili ) is a national historic site located in Mafia District of Pwani Region in Tanzania. The ruined mosques are from the 14th century, whereas other remains that have survived are often considerably more recent, from the 18th century. Even though the remains are in disrepair and are difficult to navigate, the largest standing ruin is a massive double-story building with stone staircases and a labyrinth of anterooms.

References

Pwani Region